Brigade 6 is an inactive Norwegian Infantry Brigade. Upon mobilization of the Norwegian Army, this Infantry Brigade will be under the command of the 6th Division of the Norwegian Army.

The 6th Division was commissioned in 1933 to establish a field brigade with the same number as the division. 6th Brigade is often referred to as 6 fields brigade in literature on World War II.

In 2004, plans called for Brigade 6 to be a mobilisation brigade, using the equipment earmarked for training, maintenance, and repair (the second set of equipment) of Brigade North. Brigade 6 was not to be deployable overseas for international operations, but was planned to be capable of taking part in network-based multinational operations on Norwegian territory.

References

Further Reading (Norwegian)
 6. Divisjon DKN 1940–1990, 50 år side 43, 62
 
 Fanenemnda av 2002, FO/HST, Forsvarsmuseet, Biblioteket, hylle 929.9 fan

Brigades of Norway

no:6. brigade
sl:6. brigada